Khardun Kola (also Romanized as Khardūn Kolā; also known as Khardonkolā-ye Bālā Maḩal and Khardūn Kolā-ye Bālā) is a village in Karipey Rural District, Lalehabad District, Babol County, Mazandaran Province, Iran. At the 2006 census, its population was 1,111, in 308 families.

References 

Populated places in Babol County